Live & Rare is the first live album and the first compilation of material by the American rock band Rage Against the Machine, released only in Japan on June 30, 1998, by Sony Music Japan and only available overseas as an import. It comprises "official bootlegs" previously available on other singles as well as a pair of tracks from the band's 1991 demo. The album was released digitally for the first time on July 14, 2022.

Track listing
"Bullet in the Head" – 5:43 [02.07.1993] [Amsterdam NETHERLANDS]
"Settle for Nothing" – 4:57 [02.07.1993] [Amsterdam NETHERLANDS]
"Bombtrack" – 5:53 [04.05.1993] [Minneapolis MN USA]
"Take the Power Back" – 6:11 [04.11.1993] [Vancouver BC, CANADA]
"Freedom" – 5:59 [04.11.1993] [Vancouver BC, CANADA]
"Black Steel in the Hour of Chaos" – 3:40 (with Chuck D from Public Enemy) [05.27.1996] [Radio 3FM] [Hilversum NETHERLANDS]
"Zapata's Blood" – 3:48 [05.27.1996] [Radio 3FM] [Hilversum NETHERLANDS]
"Without a Face" – 4:05 [05.27.1996] [Radio 3FM] [Hilversum NETHERLANDS]
"Hadda Be Playing on the Jukebox" – 8:02 (a poem by Allen Ginsberg) [07.09.1993] [Detroit MI USA]
"Fuck tha Police" – 4:07 (N.W.A cover) [08.13.1995] [Washington DC USA]
"Darkness" – 3:42
"Clear the Lane" – 3:48
"The Ghost of Tom Joad" (Filipino 1998 release/Japan 2000 re-issue bonus track)
"People of the Sun" (live) (Japan 2000 re-issue bonus track)
"No Shelter" (live) (Japan 2000 re-issue bonus track)
Tracks 11 & 12 from RATM Demo
Track 14 & 15 from the Best Buy Bonus CD for Renegades (the same later released with Live at the Grand Olympic Auditorium)

Personnel
Tim Commerford – bass guitar, backing vocals
Zack de la Rocha – vocals
Tom Morello – guitar
Brad Wilk – drums

Certifications

References

External links
Official Website
Axis of Justice Tom Morello and Serj Tankian's Activist Website "Axis of Justice"

1998 compilation albums
1998 live albums
B-side compilation albums
Epic Records live albums
Rage Against the Machine live albums
Rage Against the Machine compiliation albums
Epic Records compilation albums